Kristina "Tina" Satter (born ) is an American filmmaker, playwright, and director based in  York City.  She is the founder and artistic director of the theater company, Half Straddle, which formed in 2008 and received an Obie Award grant in 2013. Satter won a Guggenheim in 2020. Satter was described by Ben Brantley of the New York Times as "a genre-and-gender-bending, visually exacting stage artist who has developed an ardent following among downtown aesthetes with a taste for acidic eye candy and erotic enigmas." Her work often deals with subjects of gender, sexual identity, adolescence, and sports.

She won a Foundation for Contemporary Arts Grants to Artists award (2016), and a Doris Doris Duke Artist Impact Award in 2014. In 2019 she received a Pew Fellowship. Satter has created 10 shows with Half Straddle, and the company's shows and videos have toured to over 20 countries in the U.S., Europe, Australia, and Asia. She made her Off Broadway debut as a conceiver and director in fall 2019 with Is This a Room at the Vineyard Theatre.  A collection of three of her plays, Seagull (Thinking of You), with Away Uniform and Family was published in 2014. The text for her show Ghost Rings was published in 2017 by 53rd State Press along with a vinyl album of the show's songs.

Biography
Satter is originally from Hopkinton, New Hampshire. She attended Bowdoin College in Brunswick, Maine where she received a B.A. in English and Reed College in Portland, Oregon, where she received a M.A. in Liberal Studies. In 2007, Satter moved to Brooklyn, where she now resides, and attended Brooklyn College's M.F.A. playwriting program run by Mac Wellman.

Awards 
Tina Satter won a Guggenheim Fellowship in 2020. Her show Is This A Room was nominated for a number of awards in 2020 and received the following: Obie Award Special Citation for Concept and Direction for Tina Satter; the show won a Drama Desk Award for Unique Theatrical Experience; Emily Davis who portrayed Reality Winner in the piece was an Obie for Performance and a Lucille Lortel Award; and sound designers Sanae Yamada and Lee Kinney won an Outer Critics Circle Award.

Works
IS THIS A ROOM: Reality Winner Verbatim Transcription is the word-for-word staging of the June 2017 interrogation of the young American whistleblower Reality Winner. The show premiered at The Kitchen in New York City in January 2019, and went on to an extended, critically acclaimed Off Broadway run at the Vineyard Theatre in fall 2019. The show has been called a "blistering piece of political theater" by Artforum. The cast includes Pete Simpson, TL Thompson, Becca Blackwell, and Emily Davis.

Here I Go, pt. 2 of You was a lecture series organized at The Kitchen in March 2017 and featured lectures by artists including Sarah Schulman, Heidi Hahn, Branden Jacob-Jenkins, Claudia Rankine, Ariel Goldberg and others.

Ghost Rings is a play conceived of as feminist pop/punk show described in its New York Times review as "fantastical, odd and sometimes so tender it's raw, 'Ghost Rings' is a pop concert with a drama inside." Ghost Rings premiered in April 2016 at New York Live Arts and featured Chris Giarmo, Erin Markey, Kristen Sieh, and Tina.  It was re-mounted in New York City at the American Realness festival in January 2017. Culturebot wrote about the show "Satter’s women fantasize about procreation without men, about holding a piece of another woman in their bodies. In language that is revelatory through its very strangeness, Satter echoes this desire."

Ancient Lives opened in January 2015 at The Kitchen, and centers around a group of young women who go with their teacher into the woods where she leads them in setting up an alternative feminist community and television show and they come under the spell of a witch/warlock. Artforum wrote: "There is a strikingly synthetic quality to Tina Satter's seductive and mesmerizing 'Ancient Lives,' a play that entwines adolescence and obsolescence in order to un-tell a familiar story."

House of Dance was a collaboration with Richard Maxwell's New York City Players, and it portrays an hour in the lives of four people searching for intimacy in a small town tap dance studio. The original cast included Jess Barbagallo, Elizabeth DeMent, Jim Fletcher, and Paul Pontrelli. The show originally premiered at Abrons Art Center in 2013, and then was part of PS122's COIL Festival in January 2014. The show was nominated for a 2014 ZKB Patronage Prize at the Theater Spektakel (Zurich).

Seagull (Thinking of you) was a re-imagining of Anton Chekhov's The Seagull. This production premiered in PS122's COIL festival in New York City in 2013. The original cast included Jess Barbagallo, Eliza Bent, Becca Blackwell, Emily Davis, Julia Sirna-Frest, and Susie Sokol. Erin Markey joined the touring cast.

Away Uniform Two young women live far away from everyone they know with a mysterious man, and create a sense of home by re-enacting memories of field hockey drills and made-up rituals. It opened in 2012 at Incubator Arts Project and starred Jess Barbagallo, Emily Davis and Pete Simpson.

In The Pony Palace/FOOTBALL, a female and transgender cast portrays a high school football team. It opened at the Bushwick Starr in 2011. L Magazine wrote "The outsized and peculiar emotions of both high school and sports are brought to bear on this stylized field."

Other works include Nurses in New England from 2010, Family from 2009, and The Knockout Blow from 2008.

References

External links

Reed College alumni
Brooklyn College alumni
American dramatists and playwrights
American theatre directors
Women theatre directors
Year of birth missing (living people)
Living people
People from Hopkinton, New Hampshire
American women film directors
American screenwriters